Two Strong Hearts Live is a live album by John Farnham and Olivia Newton-John recorded in Melbourne with Philharmonia Australia in April 2015. The live album was released on 16 June 2015 with the live DVD being released on 21 August 2015.

Critical reception
Cameron Adams gave the album 4 out of 5 stars saying, "John Farnham and Olivia Newton-John have a chemistry and friendship you just can’t fake. And zero egos. The fact these two were having serious fun is not lost in the recorded translation. You also see new sides, like Farnham blitzing 'Over the Rainbow' and Livvie cutting loose with rock wailing on 'Hit the Road Jack'. That’s another one of the joys here, we rarely get to hear Olivia live and from the divine thrills of 'Xanadu' to the spine chills of I Honestly Love You it’s our loss. On the Grease favourites 'Summer Nights' and 'You’re the One That I Want', Farnham slips into John Travolta mode [and] Farnham sings 'Olivia Newton-John' better than ONJ’s original duet partner".

Chart performance
Two Strong Hearts Live debuted at number one on the ARIA Charts. This marked the second time Farnham and Newton-John had topped the charts together; in 1998, their Highlights from The Main Event album (with Anthony Warlow) also peaked at number one.

Track listing 
 "Overture”                                                                                                                       
 "Two Strong Hearts"                                                                                                                                     
 "Let Me Be There"                                                                                             
 "Xanadu"                                                                                                                             
 "I Honestly Love You"                                                                     
 "Tenterfield Saddler"                                                                                                           
 "No One Comes Close"                                                                                   
 "Love to Shine"                                                                                                 
 "Suddenly"                                                                        
 "Dare to Dream"                                                                                                 
 "Somewhere Over the Rainbow"                                                                       
 "Burn for You"                                                                                                   
 "Hit the Road Jack / Fever"                                                                                        
 "You're the One That I Want"                                                                            
 "Summer Nights"                                                                                                                               
 "Hearts on Fire"                                                                                                                                  
 "If Not for You"                                                                                                                                   
 "Everytime You Cry"                                                                                                                          
 "Physical"
 "You're the Voice"
 "It's a Long Way to the Top (If You Wanna Rock 'n' Roll)"

Charts

Weekly charts

Year-end charts

Certifications

See also
 List of number-one albums of 2015 (Australia)

References

2015 live albums
Live video albums
John Farnham live albums
Olivia Newton-John live albums
Collaborative albums
Sony Music Australia albums